Ivan Bjelobradić (born 3 February 1986) is a Croatian football midfielder.

Club career
He spent the majority of his career in the Croatian lower leagues and also had a spell in the Austrian 6th tier-Oberliga Nord.

References

External links
Ivan Bjelobradić profile at Nogometni Magazin 

1986 births
Living people
Footballers from Zagreb
Association football midfielders
Croatian footballers
NK Vrapče players
NK Zagreb players
NK Rudeš players
Croatian Football League players
First Football League (Croatia) players
Croatian expatriate footballers
Expatriate footballers in Austria
Croatian expatriate sportspeople in Austria